Cason Wallace (born November 7, 2003) is an American college basketball player for the Kentucky Wildcats of the Southeastern Conference (SEC). He was a consensus five-star recruit and one of the top players in the 2022 class.

High school career
Wallace attended Richardson High School in Richardson, Texas. As a senior, he was the Gatorade Basketball Player of the Year for Texas and the Dallas Morning News boys basketball Player of the Year after averaging 19.9 points, 7.4 rebounds and 6.1 assists per game. He was selected to play in the 2022 McDonalds All-American Game and the Jordan Brand Classic.

Recruiting
A five-star recruit, Wallace committed to the University of Kentucky to play college basketball.

References

External links
Kentucky Wildcats bio
USA Basketball bio

2003 births
Living people
American men's basketball players
Basketball players from Dallas
Kentucky Wildcats men's basketball players
McDonald's High School All-Americans
Point guards
Shooting guards